Alondra Park, also known as El Camino Village, is a census designated place (CDP) in Los Angeles County, California, United States. It is the unincorporated area north of Alondra Community Regional Park and El Camino College. It is east of Lawndale, south of Hawthorne, west of Gardena, and north of Torrance. Manhattan Beach Boulevard and Crenshaw Boulevard are the two major cross streets in the area. The population was 8,569 at the 2020 census, down from 8,592 at the 2010 census.  There is an official Alondra Park Post Office of the U.S. Postal Service in nearby Gardena, California.  Urbanized cement-lined Dominguez Creek bisects a portion of Alondra Park.

Geography
Alondra Park is located about two miles (3 km) southeast of Hawthorne.

Demographics

2010
The 2010 United States Census reported that Alondra Park had a population of 8,592. The racial makeup of Alondra Park was 3,716 (43.2%) White (21.8% Non-Hispanic White), 806 (9.4%) African American, 32 (0.4%) Native American, 1,396 (16.2%) Asian, 48 (0.6%) Pacific Islander, 2,167 (25.2%) from other races, and 427 (5.0%) from two or more races. Hispanic or Latino of any race were 4,304 persons (50.1%).

The Census reported that 8,527 people (99.2% of the population) lived in households, 59 (0.7%) lived in non-institutionalized group quarters, and 6 (0.1%) were institutionalized.

There were 2,719 households, out of which 1,198 (44.1%) had children under the age of 18 living in them, 1,383 (50.9%) were opposite-sex married couples living together, 442 (16.3%) had a female householder with no husband present, 223 (8.2%) had a male householder with no wife present.  There were 174 (6.4%) unmarried opposite-sex partnerships, and 17 (0.6%) same-sex married couples or partnerships. 513 households (18.9%) were made up of individuals, and 132 (4.9%) had someone living alone who was 65 years of age or older. The average household size was 3.14.  There were 2,048 families (75.3% of all households); the average family size was 3.56.

The population was spread out, with 2,332 people (27.1%) under the age of 18, 818 people (9.5%) aged 18 to 24, 2,581 people (30.0%) aged 25 to 44, 2,091 people (24.3%) aged 45 to 64, and 770 people (9.0%) who were 65 years of age or older.  The median age was 33.7 years. For every 100 females, there were 97.7 males.  For every 100 females age 18 and over, there were 95.4 males.

The homeowner vacancy rate was 0.7%; the rental vacancy rate was 4.1%.  4,188 people (48.7% of the population) lived in owner-occupied housing units and 4,339 people (50.5%) lived in rental housing units.

According to the 2010 United States Census, Alondra Park had a median household income of $54,484, with 20.7% of the population living below the federal poverty line.

2000
As of the census of 2000, there were 8,622 people, 2,830 households, and 2,046 families residing in the CDP. The population density was 7,562.4 inhabitants per square mile (2,920.2/km). The racial makeup of the CDP was 41.6% White, 12.6% Black or African American, 0.8% Native American, 16.3% Asian, 0.4% Pacific Islander, 22.0% from other races, and 6.2% from two or more races.  40.9% of the population were Hispanic or Latino of any race.

There were 2,830 households, out of which 40.4% had children under the age of 18 living with them, 49.6% were married couples living together, 15.2% had a female householder with no husband present, and 27.7% were non-families. 20.8% of all households were made up of individuals, and 5.9% had someone living alone who was 65 years of age or older.  The average household size was 3.05 and the average family size was 3.56.

In the CDP, the population was spread out, with 29.5% under the age of 18, 9.8% from 18 to 24, 33.2% from 25 to 44, 19.1% from 45 to 64, and 8.4% who were 65 years of age or older.  The median age was 32 years. For every 100 females, there were 101.4 males.  For every 100 females age 18 and over, there were 100.9 males.

The median income for a household in the CDP was $39,722, and the median income for a family was $45,852. Males had a median income of $33,000 versus $28,494 for females. The per capita income for the CDP was $17,175.  About 15.8% of families and 19.1% of the population were below the poverty line, including 25.1% of those under age 18 and 6.2% of those age 65 or over.

Infrastructure
The Los Angeles County Sheriff's Department (LASD) operates the Lennox Station in Lennox, serving El Camino Village (Alondra Park).

Government

Education

Primary and secondary schools
Alondra Park is served by the Lawndale Elementary School District. Three elementary schools, Kit Carson Elementary School (Preschool), Franklin D. Roosevelt Elementary School (grades TK-5), and Mark Twain Elementary School (PK-5), are located inside and serve portions of Alondra Park.
 Residents are zoned to Rogers Middle School in Lawndale. For high school residents are in the Centinela Valley Union High School District.

Colleges and universities
El Camino College is partially inside Alondra Park.

Public libraries
County of Los Angeles Library operates the Masao W. Satow Library, located in Alondra Park.

In 1913 the Moneta Branch was formed. In 1919 the Strawberry Park branch was formed. In 1958 the Strawberry Park and Moneta branches merged into the West Gardena Branch. In 1969 a fire forced the West Gardena branch to go to a new location. The current Satow building, dedicated on February 26, 1977, was named after a Japanese American in the community.

See also

References

External links
 Franklin Delano Roosevelt Elementary School
 Mark Twain Elementary School

Census-designated places in Los Angeles County, California
South Bay, Los Angeles
Census-designated places in California